Jonas Dal Andersen (born 7 July 1976) is a Danish former professional football defender and current sporting director of AB Argir.

Coaching career
In January 2013, Dal was named new manager of Hobro IK replacing Klavs Rasmussen, who had resigned a few days earlier. In his first season he led the club to a 9th place in the Danish 1st Division, but in the following season he secured the club's first ever promotion to the Danish Superliga.

In 2018 he joined FC Fredericia in the Danish 1st Division. In August 2020 he was signed by AC Horsens as replacement for Bo Henriksen. Due to a poor start to the 2020–21 season Dal was sacked on 8 December 2020.

In January 2021 he became manager of Faroese club HB Tórshavn. On 28 June 2021, Dal stepped back from his position at the club. On 6 August 2021, Dal was appointed sporting director of AB Argir.

References

External links
 Profile for FC Midtjylland

1976 births
Living people
People from Ikast-Brande Municipality
Danish men's footballers
Association football defenders
Danish 1st Division players
Ikast FS players
FC Midtjylland players
Þór Akureyri players
Skive IK players
Danish football managers
Danish Superliga managers
Danish 1st Division managers
Ikast FS managers
Hobro IK managers
Esbjerg fB managers
Kjellerup IF managers
FC Fredericia managers
AC Horsens managers
Havnar Bóltfelag managers
1. deild karla players
Danish expatriate men's footballers
Danish expatriate sportspeople in Iceland
Expatriate footballers in Iceland
Sportspeople from the Central Denmark Region